Bondho Janala (Bengali: বন্ধ জানালা English: Closed Window) is the third album by the Bengali psychedelic rock band Shironamhin. G-Series released the album on 13 April 2009 in the Bangladesh.

Background 

Bondho Janala was a bit challenging for Shironamhin as they were very much used to with sarod sound compositions. In the album they had to explore many more acoustic instruments like Esraj, Silver Flute, Trumpet etc. as the album was enriched with vivid orchestration. Lyrically Shironamhin tried to work on their already established genre of urban life talks with some bigger aspects and along with historical events or movements. Bus Stoppage was based on a regular life happening around a bus stop in your very own locality; the newspaper stand, the billboards displaying contest winner beauties, the hawkers, the little girl selling flowers in the street who could touch the glasses of the cars but couldn't touch the hearts inside or the corporate guy completely missing the enormous sky full of stars above his head while distressed with selling his dreams every now and then for the agony of life.

Track listing 
Of the album's ten songs, four were written by Ziaur Rahman Zia and two were written by Tanzir Tuhin. Two songs were written by Tushar and Kathuria, member of the band along with Zia and Tuhin.

Personnel 

 Tanzir Tuhin — Vocal
 Ziaur Rahman Zia — Bass
 Kazi Ahmad Shafin — Drums
 Diat Khan — Guitar
 Rashel Kabir — Keyboard

References

External links 
 

Shironamhin albums
2009 albums
Bengali music